Arthur James Ceely (14 October 1834 – 31 December 1866) was an English soldier and cricketer.

Ceely was born in Aylesbury, the son of James Ceely who was a Fellow of the Royal College of Surgeons. He attended Charterhouse School and, in 1854, went up to Gonville and Caius College at Cambridge University. Having played cricket for Charterhouse, he played for a Gentlemen of Kent side and for Kent County Cricket Club in 1854 before appearing in non-first-class matches for the university and his college in 1855. He was described as a "brilliant cricketer" by the archives of Gonville and Caius but played only three matches which have been given first-class cricket status.

Ceely left the university after a year and enlisted in the British army. He was commissioned in the 42nd Highlanders and saw service during the Indian Rebellion of 1857. He was at the Siege of Lucknow and at the Capture of Bareilly and was awarded the Indian Mutiny Medal. He was promoted to Lieutenant in 1858.

Ceely died at sea on 31 December 1866 off the Point-de-Galle in what was then Ceylon whilst returning to England. He was 32 years old. His parents dedicated stained glass windows to his memory at St Mary the Virgin's Church, Aylesbury.

References

External links
 

1834 births
1866 deaths
People educated at Charterhouse School
Alumni of Gonville and Caius College, Cambridge
English cricketers
Kent cricketers
Gentlemen of Kent cricketers
Gentlemen of Kent and Sussex cricketers
People who died at sea
British military personnel of the Indian Rebellion of 1857
42nd Regiment of Foot officers